This article lists the presidents of the Cortes of Aragon, the regional legislature of Aragon.

Presidents

References
 

Aragon